Tsar Maximilian is a well-known and complex Russian folk theatre, having enjoyed wide popularity throughout European Russia from the 18th to the early 20th century.

References

External links
Two different versions of the play:   

Russian plays
Russian folklore
History of theatre
Folk plays